The Superliga Profesional de Baloncesto, commonly known as the SPB, is the Venezuelan first division national professional basketball league. Founded in 1974 as the Liga Especial de Baloncesto, it adopted the name Liga Profesional de Baloncesto in the 1993 season, and the name SuperLiga in 2019. Marinos are the team with most championships with 11. The winners and runners-up of each LPB season qualify for the FIBA Americas League regular season.

The 2018 season was the last played with the name Liga Profesional de Baloncesto: in 2019 a new competition called Copa LPB was played. In late 2019 the president of the Venezuelan Basketball Federation Hanthony Coello announced the creation of a new league called SuperLiga Profesional de Baloncesto.

History

Liga Especial de Baloncesto (1974–1992) 
In 1974 the league was founded as Liga Especial de Baloncesto (Special Basketball League). The initiative came from Leonardo Rodríguez, who had come back from the United States in September 1973 and had proposed the creation of a league to Arturo Redondo, the then-president of the Venezuelan Basketball Federation. Before the foundation of this league, which involved teams from all over the country, basketball was practiced at state level. The first edition of the league included four teams: Ahorristas de Caracas, Beverly Hills (also from Caracas), Colosos de Carabobo and Toyotas de Aragua. The first league was won by Ahorristas de Caracas, which defeated Colosos de Carabobo in the championship series, 3–2. The first MVP was American forward Robert Lewis of Colosos de Carabobo. In 1975 two teams joined the league: Panteras del Táchira and Petroleros del Zulia. In 1975, Sam Shepherd of Panteras del Táchira scored a then-record 57 points against Petroleros del Zulia; that season also saw the first LPB All-Star Game. The 1975 league title was won by Colosos de Carabobo, which defeated Panteras del Táchira in the final series. In 1976, two more teams joined: Caribes de Anzoátegui and Universitarios de Mérida. The 1976 season saw the first Venezuelan player win the MVP trophy: center Ramón Rivero of Panteras del Táchira.

In 1977, the league was divided in two groups: Este (East), which included Ahorristas de Caracas, Centauros de Cojedes, Guaiqueríes de Margarita and Caribes de Anzoátegui, and Oeste (West), which had Colosos de Carabobo, Universitarios de Mérida, Banqueros de Aragua, and Panteras del Táchira. Guaiqueríes de Margarita, which had debuted in the Liga Especial in 1977, won six consecutive championships from 1977 to 1982. During this period, Guaiqueríes had three MVP winners: Venezuelan forward Cruz Lairet in 1977 and Americans Gerald Cunningham and Lewis Linder in 1980 and 1981, respectively. In 1983 the league saw the highest number of participants yet, with 9 teams: Caribes de Anzoátegui, Colosos de Carabobo, Gaiteros del Zulia, Guaiqueríes de Nueva Esparta, Panteras de Lara, Taurinos de Aragua, Telefonistas de Caracas, Universitarios de Mérida and the Venezuela national team, which participated as a preparation for the 1983 Pan American Games. In the 1983 Liga Especial Panteras won the title, ending the winning streak of Guaiqueríes. In 1984 and 1985 Gaiteros del Zulia won two consecutive titles, led by American forward Michael Britt, a second round selection in the 1983 NBA draft who was named the 1985 MVP.

Between 1986 and 1989 Trotamundos de Carabobo won four consecutive titles, with Alfonso "Al" Smith winning three MVP awards in a row (1987, 1988 and 1989). Trotamundos had several players from the Venezuela national team such as Rostyn González, Luis Jiménez, Iván Olivares and Alexander Nelcha, and import players such as Al Smith, Sam Shepherd and Leroy Combs. The 1987 season saw the debut of Víctor David Díaz, who played for Panteras de Miranda and went on to become the all-time league leader in games played, minutes played and points scored. In 1990 Bravos de Portuguesa won the title, ending Trotamundos' winning streak, with the contribution of MVP Carl Herrera, who had just graduated from the University of Houston, where he played basketball in the NCAA Division I. In 1991 Marinos de Oriente won the league title, and Marinos forward Charlie Bradley, a former player of the University of South Florida, won the MVP award. In 1992 the league title went to Cocodrilos de Caracas, who had debuted the previous season replacing Halcones de Caracas. This was the second time a team from Caracas had won the championship following Ahorristas de Caracas in 1974.

Liga Profesional de Baloncesto (1993–2019) 

In 1992 the Venezuela national team had participated in the 1992 Summer Olympics in Barcelona, Spain. This had brought increased interest to basketball in Venezuela, and started a clash between the teams of the Liga Especial and the Basketball Federation for the division of broadcasting rights. This led to the creation of the Liga Profesional de Baloncesto (Professional Basketball League), which was a league owned by the teams and not under the direct control of the Federation. The first president was Tulio Capriles.

The first edition of league was played between 8 teams, with the best 6 advancing to the first round of semifinals ("Semifinals A"), of which the winners and the best losing team qualified for the second round ("Semifinals B"): the winners of Semifinals B qualified for the championship game in a best-of-7 series. The first LPB champions were Marinos de Oriente, which defeated Trotamundos de Carabobo in the final series, 4–3. The first MVP was David Wesley, a player who then went on to have a long career in the NBA. In 1994 Trotamundos won the title against Cocodrilos de Caracas, led by MVP Stanley Brundy, another player with NBA experience. In 1995 Panteras de Miranda won the title, defeating Marinos; Marinos also qualified for the 1996 finals, where they lost to Gaiteros del Zulia. In 1996 Harold Keeling of Toros de Aragua won the MVP award: he then went on to acquire Venezuelan citizenship, and played for the Venezuela national team. In 1997 Guaiqueríes de Margarita won their first title after 15 years: that season also saw Víctor David Díaz of Panteras de Miranda win the MVP award, the first Venezuelan to win it in the LPB era, and the first after 6 consecutive American MVPs (the last Venezuelan to win the award had been Carl Herrera in 1990).

In 1998 Marinos de Oriente defeated Trotamundos in the finals, and in 1999 Trotamundos won the title defeating Panteras de Miranda. In 2000 Cocodrilos de Caracas won the final series against Gaiteros del Zulia with the decisive basket of Lee Nailon, who scored in the final seconds of the seventh game of the series. In 2001 the league title went to Gaiteros del Zulia, and in 2002 Trotamundos de Carabobo won the league after having been down 1–3 in the final series. From 2003 to 2005, Marinos de Oriente won three consecutive titles. In 2006 Trotamundos de Carabobo defeated Guaros de Lara in the championship series and reached 8 league titles, a record at the time.

In 2007 the league title was won by Guaiqueríes de Margarita. In 2008 the league was expanded to 10 teams, with the addition of Gigantes de Guayana and Deportivo Táchira. The 2008 championship went to Cocodrilos de Caracas. In 2009 Deportivo Táchira moved to La Guaira, and became Bucaneros de La Guaira. The 2009 finals were won by Marinos, which also won the 2011 and 2012 titles after losing the 2010 finals to Cocodrilos de Caracas. Marinos reached 7 consecutive finals between 2009 and 2015, winning the titles in 2009, 2011, 2012, 2014 and 2015, reaching a total of 11, the most wins by a team in league history. In 2016 Cocodrilos de Caracas won the title against Bucaneros de La Guaira: the 2015–16 season was the first and only one to be played over two years instead of one. In 2017 and 2018 Guaros de Lara won two consecutive titles. In 2019 the Liga Profesional de Baloncesto was replaced by the Copa LPB, a tournament intended as a preparation to the national team's participation in the 2019 FIBA Basketball World Cup.

SuperLiga era (2019–2022)

In December 2019 newly elected Federation president Hanthony Coello announced that a new league called SuperLiga Profesional de Baloncesto was going to replace the LPB and was scheduled to start on February 28, 2020. On March 12, 2020, the Venezuelan Basketball Federation announced via Twitter that the planning of the new tournament was halted due to the coronavirus pandemic. The SuperLiga eventually commenced on October 13, 2020. A total of 13 teams participated after Trotamundos, Guaros de Lara and Cocodrilos de Caracas withdrew. Spartans Distrito Capital won the first SuperLiga title.

SPB era (2022–present) 
On July 8, 2022, the SuperLiga and the LPB merged to form the Superliga Profesional de Baloncesto, commonly known as the SPB. The boards agreed to merge all records, statistics and championships of Venezuelan basketball.

Format and rules
The competition consists of 20 teams divided in two conferences (West and East) who play each other twice at home and twice away in the regular season, for a total of 36 games. After that, the top four teams of each conference advance to the Playoffs. Every round (1st round, conference finals and league finals) are played in a best-of-seven format.

The regular season starts in February of each year and ends in May. Also, like the NBA, an All-Star Game is held at the middle of the season.

The rule that only two foreign players can play per team still stands.

Current teams
The following 20 teams played in the 2022 SPB season.

Eastern Conference

Western Conference

List of champions

Championships 
Teams shown in italics are no longer in existence.

Awards 

 Most Valuable Player
 Grand Final MVP
 Rookie of the Year
 Defensive Player of the Year
 Sixth Man of the Year
 Most Improved Player of the Year
 Return of the Year
 Coach of the Year
 Exemplary Player of the Year
 Ideal Team of the Year
 Exemplary Team of the Year
 Manager of the Year

Statistical leaders

Points

Rebounds

Assists

Steals

Blocks

Records

Individual records 
Most games in a career
1,126 by Víctor David Díaz, 28 seasons (1987–2015)
Most minutes in a career
32,078 by Víctor David Díaz, 28 seasons (1987–2015)
Most points in a career
19,621 by Víctor David Díaz, 28 seasons (1987–2015)
Most points in a game
Regular season (overtime): 78 by Al Smith, Trotamundos de Carabobo (vs. Bravos de Portuguesa) on July 6, 1985 (3OT)
Regular season (no overtime): 76 by Víctor David Díaz, Panteras de Miranda (vs. Bravos de Portuguesa) on June 5, 2002
Playoffs: 58 by Al Smith, Trotamundos de Carabobo (vs. Bravos de Portuguesa) on May 9, 1986
Most rebounds in a game
38 by Ron Anthony, Gaiteros del Zulia (vs. Taurinos de Aragua) on May 27, 1983
Most assists in a career
4,595 by Sam Shepherd, 23 seasons (1974–1997)
Most assists in a game
28 by Leopoldo Bompart, Caribes de Anzoátegui (vs. Panteras del Táchira) on July 27, 1976
28 by Pedro Rojas, Bravos de Portuguesa (vs. Panteras de Miranda) on March 13, 1986
Most blocks in a game
Regular season: 13 by Carl Herrera, Bravos de Portuguesa (vs. Trotamundos de Carabobo) on April 20, 1986
Playoffs: 11 by Andre Riddick, Trotamundos de Carabobo (vs. Panteras de Miranda) on June 29, 1999

References

External links
Official site (Spanish)
Venezuelan league on Latinbasket.com 

 
Basketball competitions in Venezuela
Venezuela
Basketball
1974 establishments in Venezuela
Sports leagues established in 1974